Otakar Švec (23 November 1892, Prague-New Town – 3 March 1955, Prague) was a Czechoslovak sculptor best known for his colossal granite Monument to Stalin in Prague.

Career
A pupil of Josef Václav Myslbek and Jan Štursa, Švec had produced the important 1924 Futurist sculpture Sunbeam Motorcycle, now in the National Gallery in Prague, and at least three major public monuments to Tomáš Masaryk, Jan Hus, and Franklin Delano Roosevelt. The first two were destroyed by the Germans during World War II.

Švec entered the competition for the Stalin Monument in 1949, not expecting to win. The sculpture was unveiled on May Day, 1955. Švec, horrified by his own creation, had killed himself days before it was officially unveiled.

This world's largest representation of Stalin, dominating the city, stood for only seven years before the political climate changed.

References

Sources 

 Figuration/Abstraction: Strategies for Public Sculpture in Europe 1945-1968, by Charlotte Benton
 source on a recent show of Švec's work

1892 births
1955 deaths
Czechoslovak sculptors
Artists from Prague
Sculptors who committed suicide
Place of birth missing
20th-century sculptors
1955 suicides